The Newcomers is a ballet made by Miriam Mahdaviani to David Diamond's Rounds for String Orchestra (1944). The premiere took place 7 May 1988, as part of New York City Ballet's American Music Festival at the New York State Theater, Lincoln Center.

Original cast 

 
Melinda Roy
Robert La Fosse
Katrina Killian

Damian Woetzel
Roma Sosenko

External links 
NY Times review by Anna Kisselgoff, 22 May 1988

Ballets by Miriam Mahdaviani
Ballets to the music of David Diamond
New York City Ballet repertory
New York City Ballet American Music Festival
1988 ballet premieres